Vitaliy Kholod (born 15 January 2004) is a Ukrainian professional footballer who plays as a Centre-back for Rukh Lviv.

Club career

Early years
Born in Lviv, Kholod began his career in the youth sportive school #4 from his native city, where his first coaches were Andriy Chornyi and Vitaliy Ponomaryov. Then he continued in the Karpaty Lviv and the Rukh Lviv academies.

Rukh Lviv
In September 2020 he signed a contract with the Ukrainian Premier League side Rukh Lviv. He made his debut in the Ukrainian Premier League on 7 December 2022 as a second half-time substituted player in a home match against Chornomorets Odesa.

References

External links
 
 

2004 births
Living people
Sportspeople from Lviv
Ukrainian footballers
Ukraine youth international footballers
Association football defenders
FC Rukh Lviv players
Ukrainian Premier League players